Sözcü (English: Spokesperson) is a popular Turkish daily newspaper. Sözcü was first published on 27 June 2007 by Burak Akbay and is distributed nationwide. As of June 2018, it is one of the top-selling newspapers in Turkey, with around 300,000 copies sold daily.

Overview

Its origins go back to Gözcü (literally, Observer, published by Doğan Media Group) which began publication on 15 May 1996 and ceased publication on 1 April 2007. Gözcü was taken over by its employees and its name was changed to Sözcü. In its first days the newspaper sold around 60,000 copies. By September 2008, the newspaper had an average circulation of 150,000. In December 2010 this number had reached 210,000.

As a result of increasing political polarization, Sözcü has become one of the country's top-selling newspapers through its anti-government (Justice and Development Party or AKP) stance. It is the highest-selling Turkish paper that openly criticizes the ruling party and Recep Tayyip Erdoğan. Sözcü adopts a more nationalist and Kemalist political orientation than other anti-AKP papers such as Cumhuriyet and BirGün.

An edition of Sözcü aimed at the Turks of Western Europe is printed in Germany.

Korkusuz 
Another daily newspaper called Korkusuz (English: Fearless) has been published by the Sözcü Group since November 2014.

AMK

The daily sports newspaper AMK has been published by the Sözcü Group since June 2012. The name AMK is officially an acronym of Açık Mert Korkusuz (translated: Open, Valiant and Fearless) but this evoked some controversy, as the acronym is commonly understood to mean a profane phrase in Turkish.

Contributors (past and present) 

 
 Uğur Dündar  
 Emin Çölaşan
 Mehmet Şehirli
 
 Murat Muratoğlu
 Yekta Güngör Özden
 Aybars Akkor
 Kemal Baytaş
 Ege Cansen
 
 Coşkun Bel
 
 Necati Doğru
 Süleyman Atmaca
 
 
 Yasemin Candemir
 Soner Yalçın
 Bekir Coşkun
 Mehtap Özcan Ertürk

References

External links 
 

Newspapers published in Istanbul
Turkish-language newspapers
Publications established in 2007
2007 establishments in Turkey
Daily newspapers published in Turkey